Sighata is a Syrian village located in the Masyaf Subdistrict in Masyaf District, located west of Hama. According to the Syria Central Bureau of Statistics (CBS), Sighata had a population of 1,739 in the 2004 census. Its inhabitants are predominantly Alawites.

References

Bibliography

 

Populated places in Masyaf District
Alawite communities in Syria